Naomi Clarke (born 8 February 1982) is a former association football player who represented New Zealand at international level.

Clarke made her Football Ferns début in a 0–2 loss to Australia on 18 February 2004, and finished her international career with three caps to her credit.

Clarke now coaches women's soccer at Tennessee Wesleyan College in Athens, Tennessee.

References

1982 births
Living people
New Zealand women's international footballers
New Zealand women's association footballers
Women's association footballers not categorized by position
New Zealand expatriate sportspeople in the United States
Expatriate soccer managers in the United States
Tennessee Wesleyan Bulldogs women's soccer coaches